The Irish Rovers Live is a 1972 album by The Irish Rovers.

Track listing 
Side One:
"What Wid Ye Do"
"I'm a Rambler"
"Step It Out Mary"
"We'll Rant and We'll Roar"
"Sweet Thames Flow Softly"
"Windy Old Weather"
Side Two:
"Valparaiso"
"Lord of the Dance"
"Barley Mow"
"When the Shipyards Go Back on Full Time"
"Morning Town Ride"
"Road to Gundagai"

External links 
Live: the Irish Rovers at the Balladeers
The Irish Rovers Official Website

The Irish Rovers albums
1972 live albums